Linda Douglas may refer to:
 Linda Douglas (1928–2017), actress and wife of Hank Greenberg
 Linda Douglass, director of communications for the White House Office of Health Reform
 Linda Douglas (gymnast) (born 1965), Australian rhythmic gymnast